The 1891 Columbia football team was an American football team that represented Columbia University as an independent during the 1891 college football season. The team had no coach. T. Ludlow Chrystie was the team captain.

Schedule

References

Columbia
Columbia Lions football seasons
Columbia football